George White (ca. 1530 – 1584), of Hutton, Essex, was an English politician.

He was a Member (MP) of the Parliament of England for Liverpool in 1558.

References

1530s births
1584 deaths
Members of the Parliament of England (pre-1707) for Liverpool
People from East Grinstead
English MPs 1558
People from Hutton, Essex